Syed Muhammad Ameen Mian Qadri is the custodian (Sajjada Nashin) of the Khanqah-e-Barkatiya Marehra Shareef (Sufi Khanqah) of Qadri Order, a subgroup of the Indian Sufi Barelvi movement and founder of Al Barkaat Educational Institutions,Aligarh with 50,000,000 adherents.

He was senior professor and Chairman Department of Urdu at India's prestigious Aligarh Muslim University. He has been ranked 44th in the list of 500 Most Influential Muslims of the world by the Amman, Jordan-based Royal Islamic Strategic Studies Centre in collaboration with the Prince Alwaleed Bin Talal Center for Muslim-Christian Understanding at the Georgetown University, Washington DC.

Present
On 6 August 2006, the English-language daily Hindustan Times, described Ameen Mian Qaudri as the main leader of the Ahle Sunnah. His silsila is known as Barkatiya which has a lineage from Qadri silsila of Baghdad. It is said that his silsila has a following of around two million people in India and abroad. He has presided over many large gatherings in India and abroad.

He has worked for the educational uplift of Muslims of India, and started a chain of educational institutions in India with the prefix Al-Barkaat, including Al Barkaat Institute of Management Studies and Research, Al Barkaat Public School Boys, Al Barkaat Public School Girls, Al Barkaat department of Education, Al Barkaat institute of Graduate Studies, Al Barkaat Vocational Studies college, Al Barkaat Play and Learn Centre, Jamia Ahsanul Barkaat.

Disciples of His Khankah-e-Barkatiya
Ahmad Raza Khan was the disciple of  Sayyid Shah Al-e Rasul, a Sayyid and a noted Pir of the Barkatiyya family based in a small town of Marahra near Aligarh.

References

Indian Muslim scholars of Islam
Indian people of Arab descent
Indian Sufi religious leaders
Sunni Sufis
Indian Sufis
Living people
Academic staff of Aligarh Muslim University
People from Aligarh
1955 births
Barelvis
Indian Islamic studies scholars